The National Art Museum of Ukraine is a museum dedicated to Ukrainian art in Kyiv, Ukraine.

History

The National Art Museum of Ukraine, which was the first museum in Kyiv to be freely open to the public, was founded at the end of the 19th century by the efforts of Ukrainian intellectuals. 

Museum building was constructed under the project of Moscow architect Petro Boitsov in neo-classic style. This project was updated and implemented by Polish architect Władysław Horodecki. Sculpture decoration of the frontispiece is performed by Elio Salia.

The first exhibition on the occasion of the ХІ All-Russian Archaeology Conference took place in incompleted building of Kyiv City Museum of Antiquity and Art in August 1899. Official opening and consecration of the institution called Sovereign Emperor Nikolay Aleksandrovich (Nicholas II) Kyiv Art-Industrial and Scientific Museum was held on December 30, 1904.

In 1919 after the nationalization museum was called the First State, from 1924 – Taras Shevchenko All-Ukrainian Historical Museum, from 1936 – the State Ukrainian Museum, from 1939 – The State Museum of Ukrainian Art. During the Germany occupation of Kyiv in 1942 the museum was integrated with the Russian art collection under the common name the State Museum of East European Art, in 1944 the previous museum status was renewed. Changes of the museum names reflected the complicated life processes in the country and certain stages of Ukrainian museum work restoration. For example, the name changing shows the changes of museum collection's profile and separation of certain parts of this collection for establishment of other Kyiv museums.

The last name of this institution is the National Art Museum of Ukraine, it arose in 1994 in the independent Ukrainian state and it proved the highest museum status as the leading collection of Ukrainian art, which still remains the spiritual treasury of our country, its pride and wealth.

Main building architecture

It is located in a building that was constructed in 1898 by architect Władysław Horodecki for the Kyiv City Museum. It was in fact a remake of the talented Moscow architect Petr Boitsov who failed to receive a government license. The building was originally designed as a museum for the local society of patrons of arts and antique lovers. The facade of the building conveys a neoclassical architecture form – precise reproduction of a six-column porch of Doric order with entablature, triglyphs, metopes and frieze decoration depicting the Triumph of Arts. The architectural composition featuring figures of gryphons and large concrete lions at the top of the stairs were created by an Italian sculptor, Emilio Sala. On the construction of the building was expended 249,000 rubles with only 100,000 paid by the government of Russian Empire. Another 108,000 rubles were paid by the Tereshchenko family who also created the Museum of Western and Oriental Art in Kyiv. At first, at the first floor was located exhibition of the Russian archeologist Vikentiy Khvoyka who moved to Kyiv from the Kingdom of Bohemia. The museum officially opened just before Christmas on December 23, 1904, as the Kyiv Industrial Arts and Science museum of Emperor Nicholas II. The first director of museum became Mykola Biliashivsky.

Collections 

The National Art Museum of Ukraine has the most representative collection of Ukrainian figurative art in the world. Collection of the museum numbers almost 40 thousands exhibits, among which masterpieces of Ukrainian painting, sculpture, and graphics from Kyiv Rus age to nowadays are represented.

Museum has one of the best Ukrainian icon collections which opens with the rare object of the 12th century – polychrome wooden relief "Saint George with hagiography" of Byzantine origin. Middle Ages are represented with classic examples of icon painting of 14–16th centuries from the Western Ukraine, including the unique antiquities such as Holy Mother "Hodigitria" from Volyn, St. George The Dragon Slayer, and The Passion of the Christ from Halychyna region.

The collection of Ukrainian Baroque art is outstanding by its value. Here one can find amazing examples of Ukrainian baroque icons such as The Intercession with the Portrait of Bohdan Khmelnytskiy (first half of the 18th century, Kyiv region), pair icons Great Martyrs Anastasia and Juliania, Barbara and Catherine (18th century, Northern Left Bank), icons from Kyiv-Pechersk Lavra workshops from the iconostasis of Dormition Cathedral Entrance to Jerusalem and The Nativity (1729). The iconostasis from Berezna village (Chernihiv region, 1860s) is the zest of the collection. 

It shows the monumental reaching and excellent artistry of the masters of Ukrainian Baroque era. The impression of this wonderful age is strengthened by the collection of 18th century Ukrainian Portraits which represent the first secular genre in Ukrainian painting. The collection of folk paintings "Cossack the Bandura Player" is one of the biggest in the museum and expands the secular art of the Baroque period in Ukraine.

The age of the 19th century art, when St. Petersburg Academy of Arts was the trendsetter, opens with works of the famous Ukrainian portraitists, who connected their lives with the capital city of the Russian Empire – Dmytro Levytskiy and Volodymyr Borovykovskiy. Taras Shevchenko, the painter, occupies a special position in the history of Ukrainian art. Small collection of paintings and graphic works by Shevchenko gives a vision of his outstanding talent and shows new democratic tendencies in Ukrainian figurative art, continued by the artists of the next generation. Monographic collection of Mykola Pymonenko's works presents the following development of Ukrainian painting traditions which consisted in the increase of the genre subjects and transformation of painting manner from realism to impressionism. Odessa painting school led by Kiriak Kostandi is presented in the exhibition. The impression of the development of Ukrainian art is widened with the classical portraits (works by H. Vasko, A. Mokrytskiy, O. Rokachevskiy) and landscape paintings (works by V. Shternberg, V. Orlovkiy, S. Svitoslavskiy, S. Vasylkivskiy). Monographic collection of Oleksandr Murashko, bald art reformer who worked in the beginning of the 20th century, is the most interesting.

Vivid and original heritage of Ukrainian avant-garde represented in the museum is shown by the works of the world-wide famous sculptor Oleksandr Arkhypenko, painters Oleksandra Ekster, Oleksa Hryshchenko, Oleksandr Bohomazov, and Viktor Palmov. Unique trend in Ukrainian art of 1910s–1930s (called after its leading artist, Mykhailo Boichuk) "boichukism" is introduced in one of the exhibition halls. In soviet epoch boichukists were included into the list of repressed and prohibited painters and only nowadays their art has found a respective place in the museum exposition. The art of totalitarian age, in spite of the dramatic historical collisions, gave birth to a galaxy of creative individuals. The names of Fedir Krychevskiy, Anatol Petrytskiy, Tetiana Yablonska, Serhiy Hryhoriev, and Mykola Hlushchenko are inscribed in the golden book of Ukrainian art history. Collection of graphics and sculpture of the 20th century evokes special attention and desire to explore it.

The museum collection is in formation still, and the trends of contemporary of the end of the 20th – the beginning of the 21st century find their place here.

Editions 
Using the informational space for the promotion of Ukrainian artistic culture is an important goal for the National Art Museum of Ukraine.

Despite the lack of own printing resources the Museum gradually establishes issuance of its own printing products.

National Art Museum of Ukraine's Publishing Program has the following streams:

 Popularization of retrospective museum collection of the Ukrainian art;
 Scientific-monographic and self-monographic publications of the outstanding Ukrainian art persons;
 Scientific catalogues to large-scale exhibitions of the National Art Museum of Ukraine;
 "Muzeinyi Provulok (Museum Lane)" magazine.

Publication of the "National Art Museum of Ukraine" art album of significant size and content ("Artania Nova" Publishing House) became an important museum event in 2003. This album is the first step on this long way. Covering a large volume of information on museum's past and nowadays and its collections, this album presents the Ukrainian art history in this significant manner for the first time ever. It is the result of several scientific generations’ hard work.

2004 – following publications were issued

 "Ukrainian Painting of 19th – early 20th century"
 "Ukrainian Icon Painting of 12th – early19th century"
 "Serhiy Vasylkivskiy"

From May 2004 – in the focus of attention was

 "Muzeinyi Provulok (Museum Lane)" magazine

2005 – published

 monographic album "Oleksandr Murashko"

2006 – issued

 "Ukrainian Painting of 20th – early 21st century"
 "Ukrainian Portrait of XVII-XVIII centuries"
 monographs "M.Pymonenko, V.Orlovskiy"
 "S.Svitoslavskiy"
 "Ukrainian Modernism"
 6th number of "Muzeinyi Provulok (Museum Lane)" magazine

2007– 2008 – published

 7, 8 and 9 numbers of "Muzeinyi Provulok (Museum Lane)" magazine

Current exhibition
Today, the museum continues to expand its collection. Some new additions include a unique icon relief of St. George and works by the international Kyiv born pioneer of Geometric abstract art Kazimir Malevich.

The current exhibition includes over 20 thousand pieces. Among many are works by a now world-renowned constructivist Vasiliy Yermilov, and Cubo-Futurist Alexander Bogomazov. The Ukrainian side is represented by works of famous Ukrainian and Russian artists such as David Burliuk, Aleksandra Ekster, Vadim Meller, Kliment Red'ko, Solomon Nikritin, Victor Palmov, Maria Sinyakova, Mykhailo Boychuk, Mykola Pymonenko, Ilya Shtilman and many others.

On April 26, 2014, Art retrieved from the ex-president Victor Yanukovich's home is being exhibited at the museum.

Now Museum collects unofficial art works of totalitarian period — Ukrainian underground from the end of 1950 until 1991, articularly art woks by Feodosiy Tetianych, Mykola Trehub, Vudon Baklytskyi, Olena Golub and others.

Gallery

References

Further reading
 
 
in Ukr.: Національний художній музей України: Альбом/ Уклад., авт. ст.: Т.Рязанова, Л.Членова, О.Жбанкова та ін.- К.: Артанія Нова, 2003.- 416 с. 
 Kyiv Sightseeing Guide (2001) .

External links

 Information about the museum from Kiev.info
 Official website (in Ukrainian)
 Information about the museum at the Museums of Ukraine website (in Ukrainian)

1899 establishments in Ukraine
Art museums established in 1899
Buildings and structures completed in 1898
Art museums and galleries in Ukraine
Art Museum
Museums in Kyiv
Neoclassical architecture in Kyiv
Hrushevsky Street (Kyiv)
Architectural monuments of Ukraine of national importance in Kyiv
Institutions with the title of National in Ukraine